Although there is an extradition agreement and a 'Treaty of Mutual Assistance on Criminal Matters' between Australia and Indonesia, there is currently no formal agreement for prisoner transfer between the two countries. An Australian prisoner under sentence in Indonesia must serve their entire sentence there, and vice versa.

Course of negotiations
Justice authorities of both countries have been in negotiations since April 2005 to forge a mutually acceptable Agreement.

In June 2006, Indonesia's Minister of Law and Human Rights Hamid Awaluddin stated that he and Phillip Ruddock, Australia's attorney general were 'in full agreement' about the content of a proposed agreement.

Australian Justice Minister Chris Ellison had sought agreement by September 2006 and has speculated upon a completion date of early 2007 with the first prisoner transfers to occur soon after.
However, a draft provided by him to the Indonesian Ministry of Justice and Human Rights was deemed unacceptable in late December 2006.

The majority of Indonesian nationals in Australian prisons are in custody for illegal immigration or illegal fishing, while there are eleven Australians in Indonesian prisons on drug offences.  There are between 40 and 50 Indonesians in Australian prisons.

Australian Attorney-General, Philip Ruddock, revealed on 6 March 2007 that discussions over the minimum time prisoners must serve in the country where they were sentenced had been largely resolved. Prisoners would have to serve at least half of their sentence in the jurisdiction in which they were committed.

In reference to Schapelle Corby being treated for depression in May 2009, foreign minister Stephen Smith said that the end to negotiations between Australia and Indonesia was not yet in sight.

See also
 Australia–Indonesia relations
 Foreign relations of Australia
 Foreign relations of Indonesia
 List of Australians imprisoned or executed abroad
 Bali Nine
 Schapelle Corby

Notes

External links
Australian Minister for Justice and Customs announces intention to seek Agreement, 7 April 2005
Australia, Indonesia 'to swap prisoners', 12 October 2006
Agreement expected early 2007
Preparations for Aus-Indo prisoner exchange agreement
Indonesia rejects prisoner exchange draft, 29 December 2006
Australia-Indonesia Extradition Teaty, in force from 21 January 1995
Treaty between Australia and the Republic of Indonesia on Mutual Assistance in Criminal Matters, in force from 17 July 1999
Australia's INTERNATIONAL TRANSFER OF PRISONERS ACT 1997

Penal system in Australia
Extradition
Australia–Indonesia relations
Prisoner exchanges